This is a list of the National Register of Historic Places listings in Wayne County, Michigan.

This is intended to be a complete list of the properties and districts on the National Register of Historic Places in Wayne County, Michigan, United States. Latitude and longitude coordinates are provided for many National Register properties and districts; these locations may be seen together in an online map.

There are 363 properties and districts listed on the National Register in the county, including 14 National Historic Landmarks. The city of Detroit is the location of 278 of these properties and districts, including 10 National Historic Landmarks; they are listed separately, while 86 properties and districts, including 4 National Historic Landmarks, are listed here. A single property straddles the city limits and thus appears on more than one list.



Detroit

The majority of NRHP properties in Wayne County are in Detroit. These properties represent over a century's worth of the city's growth, from the Charles Trowbridge House (built in 1826, and the oldest known structure in the city) to structures in the Detroit Financial District built in the late 1950s and early 1960s. However, due to the growth of Detroit and successive waves of redevelopment, there are few structures in the city dating from before the Civil War. Some of these structures, including the Trowbridge House, are private homes built along East Jefferson: the Sibley House (1848), the Beaubien House (1851), and the Moross House (1855). Other extant pre-1860 structures include Fort Wayne (1849); Saints Peter and Paul Church (1848) and Mariner's Church (1849); and scattered commercial buildings (one in Randolph Street Commercial Buildings Historic District, for example).

Most of the listed structure in Detroit are associated with the changes wrought by the establishment of substantial industry in the city (in the late 19th century) and the subsequent rise of the automobile industry to a dominant position (in the early 20th century). The historically significant structures include not only manufacturing facilities, but associated office buildings, and the commercial and residential properties built to serve the influx of people into Detroit.

In the latter half of the 19th century, multiple manufacturing firms were established near Jefferson to take advantage of the transportation resources afforded by the river and a parallel rail line. These included the shipyard that eventually became the Dry Dock Engine Works-Detroit Dry Dock Company Complex, Parke-Davis, the Frederick Stearns Company, and Globe Tobacco. The rise of manufacturing led to a new class of wealthy industrialists, entrepreneurs, and professionals who built houses along Jefferson and Woodward Avenue, including the Croul-Palms House (1881), the William H. Wells House (1889), the John N. Bagley House (1889), the Col. Frank J. Hecker House (1888) and the Charles Lang Freer House (1887). Along with these private homes, upscale apartments, such as the Coronado Apartments (1894), the Verona Apartments (1894) and a spate of churches, such as the Cass Avenue Methodist Episcopal Church (1883), the First Presbyterian Church (1889), were constructed in the city.

At the turn of the 20th century, entrepreneurs in the Detroit area—notably Henry Ford—forged into production of the automobile, capitalizing on the already-existing machine tool and coach-building industry in the city. Early automotive production is recognizable by structures such as the Ford Piquette Avenue Plant (1904) (a National Historic Landmark), and multiple structures in the surrounding Piquette Avenue Industrial Historic District (including the now-destroyed E-M-F/Studebaker Plant, 1906) and the New Amsterdam Historic District (including the original Cadillac factory, 1905. As the industry grew, newly minted automotive magnates built commercial and office buildings such as General Motors Building (1919) and the Fisher Building (1928), both National Historic Landmarks. The industry accelerated the growth of Detroit, and the population boom led to the construction of apartment buildings aimed at the middle-class auto worker, including the Somerset Apartments (1922), the Garden Court Apartments (1915), and the Manchester Apartments (1915). At the same time, new upscale neighborhoods farther from the center of the city sprang up, including Boston-Edison, Indian Village, and Palmer Woods.

Automobile wealth led to a boom in downtown Detroit business, and the construction of a collection of early 20th century skyscrapers. The most notable of these is the Art Deco National Historic Landmark Guardian Building (1928), but numerous other significant office buildings such as the Vinton Building (1916), the Barlum Tower (1927), and the Lawyers Building (1922) were also constructed. The building boom was not confined to businesses. Shopping districts sprang up along Park Avenue, Broadway, and Woodward. Multiple hotels were constructed, including the Fort Shelby Hotel (1916), the Detroit-Leland Hotel (1927), the Royal Palm Hotel (1924), and many others. Extravagant movie theaters such as the Fox (1928) and the Palms (1925) were constructed. And public buildings, such as Orchestra Hall (1919), the Detroit Public Library (1921), and the Detroit Institute of Arts (1923).

Other municipalities

Rural Western Wayne County: Canton and Livonia
In marked contrast to Detroit, urban and suburban development came late to the western part of Wayne County. Although suburbs are steadily encroaching into and through these areas, there are still pockets of rural land. The later development has protected some early structures, giving Canton in particular a more significant population of antebellum structures than even the older and larger Detroit. These include a string of Greek Revival structures: the Sheldon Inn (1825), Clyde House (1845), Kinyon House (1850), Bradford House (1860), and the Patterson House. Livonia also boasts Greenmead Farms, which is the original location of Joshua Simmons's 1841 Greek Revival farmhouse and 1829 barn; other structures have been moved to the site.

Victorian-era houses have also recognized. These include the Truesdell House (1888), the Fischer Farmstead (1897), the Orson Everitt House (1899), and the Smith House (1904). In addition, the Wilson Barn in Livonia, instrumental in Ira Wilson's establishment of a million-dollar dairy, creamery, and trucking business, is recognized.

However, not all historically significant structures have been protected from time and redevelopment. In particular, both the Boldman House (1835) and the Dingledey House (1881) have been demolished since their listing on the Register.

Village Western Wayne County: Plymouth and Northville
The villages of Northville and Plymouth boast historically significant houses representing a span of decades. The Northville Historic District contains numerous residential structures built between 1835 and the 1890s with most being early Gothic revival homes. Another significant property—the Robert Yerkes House—is also in Northville, but across the county line in Oakland County. Plymouth contains two important Victorian-era homes—the Italianate Henry W. Baker House (1875) and the Stick-Eastlake Charles G. Curtiss Sr. House (1890)-- as well as the Frank Lloyd Wright-designed Carlton D. Wall House (1941).

Another historically important structure is farther east in Dearborn. The Commandant's Quarters was part of the Detroit Arsenal, built in 1833 in what was then the village of Dearbornville. Despite the growth of the surrounding city and the demolition or substantial alteration of the other Arsenal structures, the Commandant's Quarters has remained relatively intact.

Henry Ford's Wayne County: Dearborn
The automobile industry has had a profound effect on the development of Wayne County, and Ford Motor Corporation founderHenry Ford was one of the most influential pioneers. Ford put an indelible stamp on the history of Wayne County in general and Dearborn in particular, with not just one, but five National Historic Landmarks to his name. One of these Landmarks, the Ford Piquette Avenue Plant, is in Detroit; another (the Highland Park Ford Plant) is in Highland Park. The other three are in Dearborn. One of these Landmarks, the Ford River Rouge Complex, represents Henry Ford's industrial vision. Fair Lane was his personal estate. And Greenfield Village and Henry Ford Museum exemplified Ford's love of and passion for history.

Ford also had other properties that found their way onto the National Register. The Dearborn Inn and Colonial Homes were built by Ford as an airport hotel, and the Ford Valve Plant in Northville was an experimental factory. Perhaps most significantly, the Henry Ford Square House was built by Henry Ford himself soon after his marriage to Clara Ford, and well before his ascent to being the richest man in the world.

The Enclaves: Highland Park and Hamtramck
Together, Highland Park and Hamtramck form an enclave within the city of Detroit. Both were established as independent municipalities when Detroit was much smaller than its current size, and remained so as the larger city grew to engulf them both. Both cities also owe much of their history and present character to the rise and eventual decline of the automobile industry. As noted, the most significant structure within Highland Park is the Highland Park Ford Plant (1910); likewise Hamtramck housed the huge Dodge Main plant (1914). Both plants attracted huge numbers of workers, swelling the populations of both cities.

The influx of workers required housing. Two neighborhoods in Highland Park: Highland Heights-Stevens' Subdivision and Medbury's-Grove Lawn Subdivisions were significant because of their relatively middle-class residents who were able to build solid houses. The burgeoning population also required religious buildings. These included St. Florian (1928) in Hamtramck, serving the primarily Polish residents of the city, and the Highland Park Presbyterian Church (1910), First United Methodist Church (1916), Trinity United Methodist Church (1911), and the Grace Evangelical Lutheran Church (1929) in Highland Park.

Northeast Wayne County: The Grosse Pointes
The rise in industry and the automobile also affected the Grosse Pointes. This section of the county was a primarily agricultural district throughout much of the 19th century until Detroit's nouveau riche discovered the area and began building summer cottages there. As automobiles became more prevalent, and outlying suburbs more accessible, the Pointes quickly became a community of year-round upper-class residents. The historic structures within the cities reflect its transition to the home of wealthy Detroiters. These structures include early 20th-century houses in the Beverly Road Historic District and single-family homes such as the Carl E. and Alice Candler Schmidt House (1909) and the Russell A. Alger Jr. House (1910).

The growing population at the turn of the 20th century also called for the construction of educational buildings such as Defer Elementary School (1924) Grosse Pointe South High School (1927), Père Gabriel Richard Elementary School (1929), and religious buildings such as Saint Paul Catholic Church (1895), Grosse Pointe Memorial Church (1923), and Christ Church Chapel (1930).

Downriver: Lincoln Park, Wyandotte, and Grosse Ile
Lincoln Park is a blue-collar downriver suburb. The two properties in the city, the Lincoln Park Post Office and Mellus Newspapers Building are both of relatively recent origin.

In contrast, Wyandotte is an older city, and has seen its share of wealthy citizens. The Marx House, built by Warren Isham in 1862, housed a number of the city's most prominent citizens, and did the John and Emma Lacey Eberts House, built in 1872. Industrial giant Edward Ford was the son of glass pioneer John Baptiste Ford and the founder of the Michigan Alkalai Company in Wyandotte and the Ford Plate Glass Company in Toledo, Ohio (later the Libbey–Owens–Ford Company). Ford built both the impressive Ford-Bacon House and the George P. MacNichol House across the street.

Grosse Ile, near the southern tip of Wayne County, is a historically wealthy island community. Beginning in the middle of the 19th century, well-to-do businessmen from Detroit built summer homes on the island to escape the city. Some of the earliest mansions are included in the East River Road Historic District, and the nearby St. James Episcopal Church was built not long after the end of the Civil War.

Wayne County bridges
The Wayne County Road Commission was internationally renowned for its innovation. The historic bridges of Wayne County are scattered throughout the county, with two in the far western portion, one in Dearborn, three in Detroit, and the remainder close to the Detroit River south of the city. The western bridges—the Waltz Road – Huron River Bridge and the Lilley Road-Lower Rouge River Bridge—exemplify the population and traffic expansion in that portion of Wayne County during the early part of the century, and demonstrate the benefits of standardization in bridge construction adopted by the Road Commission. Likewise, the bridges along the river and on Grosse Ile show the variety of small bridges and culverts the Commission constructed.

The Detroit bridges were a result of a grade separation carried on by the Commission to separate rail and automotive traffic, necessitated by the rise of the automobile. Another example of accommodating different modes of traffic is the bascule construction of the West Jefferson Avenue – Rouge River Bridge. This was built to maintain shipping traffic in the river while allowing for automobile traffic along West Jefferson. The most recent of the historical bridges, the US 12 Bridges in Dearborn, represent the first crosstown expressway carrying automobile traffic through Detroit.

Listings

|}

Former listings

|}

See also
List of Michigan State Historic Sites in Wayne County, Michigan
List of National Historic Landmarks in Michigan
National Register of Historic Places listings in Michigan
Listings in neighboring counties: Macomb, Monroe, Oakland, Washtenaw

References

External links

 02
Wayne County
Tourist attractions in Metro Detroit